Ljubav may refer to:
 Ljubav (Ekatarina Velika album), 1987
 Ljubav (Trigger album), 2007
Ljubav (Bojana Vunturišević album), 2023